The All-College Basketball Classic is a college basketball event that has been played during the winter holidays in Oklahoma City since 1935.  It is now held at the Chesapeake Energy Arena. Although it has not followed a true tournament format since 2000, the All college Basketball Classic outdates even the NCAA, NIT, NAIA, and NBA tournaments.

The All College Tournament was originally conceived by Henry P. Iba, the coach at  Oklahoma A&M, and Bus Ham, sports editor of The Oklahoman.  The original purpose of the tournament was to increase interest in high school basketball in Oklahoma, and thereby to improve the quality of the college teams in the state.  The first tournament included 16 teams from Oklahoma, Texas, and Kansas, and was played at Classen High School; Oklahoma A&M won the first title game over Tulsa, 40–17.  Two years later the tournament had grown to 32 teams.  When the publisher of The Oklahoman made known its intention to end its sponsorship, the Oklahoma City All Sports Association was formed in 1957 to take over the tournament.

The size, sponsorship, and success of the tournament varied over the years, shrinking to four teams in 1981. In 1999 it had what one report called "one of its worst fields ever" with three small college programs along with Oklahoma.  The last traditionally-formatted tournament was played in 2000, with Oklahoma beating SMU 79–78 in the title game.  Beginning in 2001, the event switched to a "classic" format, with a pre-determined schedule and no title game.  In 2013 the event included women's basketball for the first time, presenting a doubleheader featuring the Oklahoma State men's and women's teams each playing a game against an out-of-state foe.

References

External links
Official website

Recurring sporting events established in 1935
History of college basketball in the United States
Basketball competitions in Oklahoma City
College men's basketball competitions in the United States
1935 establishments in Oklahoma
College sports tournaments in Oklahoma